Tarek Ahmad El Ali (born 6 February 1986) is a Lebanese former footballer who played as a forward.

Club career

Nejmeh 
El Ali signed for Lebanese Premier League side Nejmeh's youth team on 4 August 2003. He began his senior career aged 17, in 2004–05. In his only season at Nejmeh, El Ali helped his side win the league, the Elite Cup, and the Super Cup.

Mabarra 
In 2005 the Lebanese forward moved to Mabarra, staying seven seasons at the club, until 2012. El Ali won the Lebanese FA Cup with Mabarra 2007–08, the club's first, and competed in the 2009 AFC Cup. On 5 May 2009, El Ali scored his first AFC Cup goal against Iraqi club Erbil. However, with two wins in six matches, Mabarra came last in their group and were knocked-out of the competition.

Ahed 
In 2012 El Ali moved to Ahed. During his four-season stay, he won a league title (2014–15), two Elite Cups (2013 and 2015), and a Super Cup (2015).

Loan to Tadamon Sour 
On 17 August 2016, Tadamon Sour announced the signing of El Ali on a one-year loan from Ahed. Following a year at Tadamon Sour, playing 16 games and scoring twice, the loan was extended for two more years.

Return to Ahed 
On 12 September 2019, Ahed announced the return from loan of El Ali. In his first season after returning to the club, El Ali helped Ahed lift the 2019 Super Cup, as well as the 2019 AFC Cup.

International career
On 18 April 2007, El Ali scored two goals for Lebanon U23, in a 2–1 win against Indonesia in the 2008 Olympic Games Qualifiers. He also played for the senior team, scoring two goals in five games between 2007 and 2011.

Career statistics

International

Honours 
Nejmeh
 Lebanese Premier League: 2004–05
 Lebanese Elite Cup: 2004
 Lebanese Super Cup: 2004

Mabarra
 Lebanese FA Cup: 2007–08

Ahed
 AFC Cup: 2019
 Lebanese Premier League: 2014–15, 2021–22
 Lebanese Elite Cup: 2013, 2015; runner-up: 2021
 Lebanese Super Cup: 2015, 2019

Individual
 Lebanese Premier League Team of the Season: 2010–11

See also
 List of Lebanon international footballers born outside Lebanon

References

External links

 
 
 
 
 
 

1986 births
Living people
People from Kenema
Lebanese footballers
Lebanese people of Sierra Leonean descent
Sierra Leonean people of Lebanese descent
Sportspeople of Sierra Leonean descent
Sportspeople of Lebanese descent
Association football forwards
Nejmeh SC players
Al Mabarra Club players
Tadamon Sour SC players
Al Ahed FC players
Lebanese Premier League players
Lebanon youth international footballers
Lebanon international footballers
AFC Cup winning players